Everything You Always Wanted to Know About R. Stevie Moore But Were Afraid to Ask is the third official album by R. Stevie Moore, a double album compilation issued on vinyl in 1984 by New Rose Records of Paris, France. It was the first of four New Rose RSM albums to be released through the 1980s.

Background
It contains Moore's songs and sound experiments from Nashville TN and Montclair NJ sessions, all primarily recorded on 1/4 track 7½ ips reel-to-reel stereo tape decks. The name of the album is a homage to the 1972 movie Everything You Always Wanted to Know About Sex* (*But Were Afraid to Ask). Its title in French is "TOUT CE QUE VOUS AVEZ TOUJOURS VOULU SAVOIR SUR R. STEVIE MOORE ET QUE VOUS N'AVEZ JAMAIS OSER DEMANDER".

Long out of print and never reissued on compact disc, it was reconstructed from original song master tapes for improved fidelity by the artist in 2002. The original vinyl issue had suffered in audio quality from improperly mastered compilation tapes and also by the process of squeezing so much material on each side of the records.

The album was the first R. Stevie Moore release that Ariel Pink heard.

Track listing

North and South Sides (CD1)
 WORLD'S fair
 I just WANT TO feel YOU
 the HOLOCAUST parade
 EATING paper, DRINKING ink
 CHANTILLY lace (Richardson)
 SHOW biz IS dead
 the path OF JOY
 PUTTIN' up THE groceries
 ONE moore TIME
 FORECAST
 no TALKING

 WELCOME TO london
 I wanna hit YOU
 bloody KNUCKLES (Moore/Griffin/Price)
 JUMP out IN front OF a car
 TOPIC of SAME
 i hate PEOPLE
 HIS LATEST flame (Pomus/Shuman)
 RIGHT perfume WRONG mouthwash
 for VINI
 (some CD issues add Paris Diary audio filler)

East and West Sides (CD2)
 FIRST-hand
 teen ROUTINES
 NEW strings
 ONCE and for ALL
 adult TREE (Moore/Anderson)
 PASKETTI
 misplacement
 WHY can't i WRITE a HIT
 PLAY

 U.R. true
 backbone BREAK
 wayne WAYNE (go away)
 DEBBIE
 The meeting THAT COULDN'T be
 MAMA weer ALL CRAZEE now (Holder/Lea)
 i hope THAT YOU remember
 (some CD issues add still more Paris Diary audio filler)

References

External links
 RSM's EVERYTHING webpage

R. Stevie Moore albums
1984 compilation albums
New Weird America albums